Martín Andrés Cauteruccio Rodríguez (born 14 April 1987) is a Uruguayan professional footballer who plays as a striker for Argentine club Independiente.

Career
Born in Montevideo, Cauteruccio began his professional career with local side Nacional. He joined Argentine Primera División side Quilmes, where he would lead the club in goal-scoring despite the club's struggles near the bottom of the league table.

Career statistics

Honours
San Lorenzo
 Argentine Primera División: 2013 Inicial
 Copa Libertadores: 2014
 Supercopa Argentina: 2015

Cruz Azul
 Copa MX: Apertura 2018
 Supercopa MX: 2019
 Leagues Cup: 2019

Individual
 Copa MX Top Scorer: Apertura 2018

References

External links
 

1987 births
Living people
Uruguayan sportspeople of Italian descent
Uruguayan footballers
Uruguayan expatriate footballers
Association football forwards
Club Nacional de Football players
Central Español players
Racing Club de Montevideo players
Quilmes Atlético Club footballers
San Lorenzo de Almagro footballers
Cruz Azul footballers
Estudiantes de La Plata footballers
Aldosivi footballers
Uruguayan Primera División players
Argentine Primera División players
Primera Nacional players
Liga MX players
Uruguayan expatriate sportspeople in Argentina
Uruguayan expatriate sportspeople in Mexico
Expatriate footballers in Argentina
Expatriate footballers in Mexico